Sir Timothy Mark Hitchens,  (born 1962) is a British diplomat and a former Assistant Private Secretary to the Queen Elizabeth II in the Royal Household of the Sovereign of the United Kingdom, 1999–2002.

Hitchens was seconded from the Foreign and Commonwealth Office, to which he returned to become Head of the Africa Department (Equatorial). He had been First Secretary Political and Information, British High Commission, Islamabad and speechwriter for Foreign Secretary Douglas Hurd.

Early life and career 
Hitchens was born in 1962, and was educated at Dulwich College from 1972 to 1979. He then attended Christ's College, University of Cambridge, where he read English literature. After joining the Foreign and Commonwealth Office he studied Japanese, and then became Trade Secretary in Tokyo.

Career 
Hitchens was Private Secretary to The Rt Hon Tristan Garel-Jones, Minister of State for Europe at the Foreign and Commonwealth Office 1990 to 1993, and speechwriter to the Foreign Secretary The Rt Hon Douglas Hurd from 1993 to 1994. He was Head of the Political Section at the British Embassy in Islamabad, Pakistan, 1994 to 1997.

From 2005 to 2008 Hitchens was Deputy Ambassador at the British Embassy in Paris.

From autumn 2008, Hitchens took up the position Director, European Political Affairs, in London. In August 2010 he became Director, Africa.

In 2012, Hitchens was appointed as HM Ambassador to Japan. He opened a Twitter account under the handle 'UKAmbTim' and, had over 7000 followers. He often tweets in Japanese. Hitchens was succeeded by Paul Madden in January 2017.

Hitchens was appointed chief executive officer of the Commonwealth Summit 2018 in March 2017.

In January 2017, Hitchens was elected President of Wolfson College, Oxford. He assumed this post on 1 May 2018.

Honours 
Hitchens was appointed Companion of the Order of St Michael and St George (CMG) in the 2012 New Year Honours.

Personal life 
Hitchens has one daughter (born 1991) and one son (born 1993).

References

Sources
British ambassador laments his two ‘lost decades’ The Japan Times, 9 April 2013

1962 births
Living people
Diplomats from London
People educated at Dulwich College
Alumni of Christ's College, Cambridge
Assistant Private Secretaries to the Sovereign
Companions of the Order of St Michael and St George
British expatriates in Pakistan
Ambassadors of the United Kingdom to Japan
Knights Commander of the Royal Victorian Order
20th-century British diplomats
21st-century British diplomats
Presidents of Wolfson College, Oxford